Treveighan is a village in the parish of Michaelstow, Cornwall, England, United Kingdom. It is half a mile northwest of Michaelstow.

References

External links
Treveighan, Cornwall; Explore Britain

Villages in Cornwall